The 2013 Veikkausliiga was the 83rd season of top-tier football in Finland. The season began on 13 April 2013 and ended on 26 October 2013. HJK Helsinki are the defending champions.

Teams
FC Haka were relegated to Ykkönen after finishing at the bottom of the 2012 season. Their place was taken by Ykkönen champions RoPS.

Team summaries

Managerial changes

League table

Results

Matches 1–22

Matches 23–33

Statistics

Top scorers
Source: veikkausliiga.com

Top assists
Source: veikkausliiga.com

Monthly awards

Annual awards
Source: Kauden 2013 pelipaikkojen parhaat nimetty

See also
 2013 Ykkönen
 2013 Kakkonen

References

External links
 Official site 
 uefa.com

Veikkausliiga seasons
Fin
Fin
1